Charles Edward Lockett (born October 1, 1965) is a former American football wide receiver who played two seasons with the Pittsburgh Steelers of the National Football League (NFL). He was drafted by the Steelers in the third round of the 1987 NFL Draft. He played college football at Long Beach State University and attended Crenshaw High School in Los Angeles, California. Lockett was also a member of the New York/New Jersey Knights of the World League of American Football.

He appeared as a contestant on the 1980s game show Scrabble.

References

External links
Just Sports Stats
College stats

Living people
1965 births
Players of American football from Los Angeles
American football wide receivers
African-American players of American football
Long Beach State 49ers football players
Pittsburgh Steelers players
New York/New Jersey Knights players
Crenshaw High School alumni
National Football League replacement players
21st-century African-American people
20th-century African-American sportspeople